Barry Jonsberg (born 1951) is an Australian author and teacher who was born in Liverpool. He earned two degrees in English and Psychology from Liverpool University and was a college lecturer in Crewe, Cheshire before moving to Australia in 1999.

His book The Whole Business with Kiffo and the Pitbull was shortlisted for the 2005 Children's Book Council Awards in the Older Readers category, and was given a special mention the 2005 White Ravens Selection of International Children's and Youth Literature. It's not all about YOU, Calma won the 2006 South Australian Festival Award for Children's Literature. Dreamrider was shortlisted for the 2007 NSW Premier's Award. The Dog that Dumped on my Doona was shortlisted for the Territory Read Literature Award 2008. My Life as an Alphabet won the 2013 Children's Peace Literature Award for older readers. His 2022 book, A Little Spark, was shortlisted for the Ethel Turner Prize for Young People's Literature at the 2023 New South Wales Premier's Literary Awards.

Books

 The Whole Business with Kiffo and the Pitbull (2004) 
 The Crimes and Punishments of Miss Payne (2005)
 It's not all about YOU, Calma (September 2005) 
 Am I Right or Am I Right? (2007)
 Dog that Dumped on my Doona (August 2008)
 Dreamrider (2006)
 Ironbark (2008) 
 Cassie (2008) 
 A Croc Called Capone (March 2009) 
 Blacky Blasts Back: On the Tail of the Tassie Tiger (January 2010) 
 My Life As An Alphabet (2013) Released September 2014 in America as The Categorical Universe of Candice Phee 
 Pandora Jones: Admission (2014) 
 The City of Second Chances (2014) 
 A Song Only I Can Hear (2018) 
 Catch me if I fall (2020)
 A Little Spark (2022)

References

External links
 Official website

1951 births
Australian children's writers
Living people
English emigrants to Australia